The Glutton Bowl (or The Glutton Bowl: The World's Greatest Eating Competition) is a two-hour competitive eating special that was broadcast Fox Network on February 21, 2002 and was sanctioned by the International Federation of Competitive Eating. The special, which was co-executive produced by Nash Entertainment and IFOCE co-founder Richard Shea, featured  Mark Thompson and IFOCE co-founder George Shea as hosts/color commentators.  The 32-eater tournament was won by Takeru Kobayashi of Japan.  The event also included such noteworthy world record eaters as Eric "Badlands" Booker, Dominic "The Doginator" Cardo, Don "Moses" Lerman, Edward "Cookie" Jarvis, and Bill "El Wingador" Simmons.

Contest Set Up 
The competition was set up to have 3 rounds — the qualifiers, the wild card round, and the finals. In each round competitors were to eat the most of one specified food in a set amount of time. The winner of each qualifying competition was automatically in the finals. The runner up in each qualifier competed in the wild card round and the winner of that was the last person put in the final.

Round-by-Round 
The list of foods eaten in each round and the winning amount eaten are as follows (each competition was 12 minutes long):

Qualifying Rounds
 Hard-boiled eggs
 the winner, Eric "Badlands" Booker (USA), ate 38 eggs
 Quarter-pound sticks of butter
 the winner, Don "'Paula Deen' Moses" Lerman (USA), ate 10 sticks
 Whole beef tongue
  to each tongue
 the winner, Dominic "The Doginator" Cardo (USA), ate 1 tongue plus a few bites of another
 Hot Dogs
 the winner, Takeru Kobayashi (Japan), ate 31 hot dogs — bun and all
 Mayonnaise
  per bowl.
 Hamburgers
  meat patties plus the bun (fast food type burgers) 
the winner, Jed "The Jalapeno King" Donahue (USA), ate 11 hamburgers
 Sushi
, . sushi roll, including two  pieces of wasabi
the winner, Bill "El Wingador" Simmons (USA), consumed 

Wild Card Round
 Cooked (but not fried) Rocky Mountain Oysters
 

Finals
 Cow brain ( each)
 won by Takeru Kobayashi (Japan)

References 

Competitive eating
Fox Broadcasting Company original programming
2002 television specials
2000s American television specials